Elk Township is one of the fifteen townships of Noble County, Ohio, United States.  The 2000 census found 305 people in the township.

Geography
Located in the southeastern corner of the county, it borders the following townships:
Franklin Township, Monroe County - northeast
Bethel Township, Monroe County - east
Liberty Township, Washington County - south 
Salem Township, Washington County - southwest
Jefferson Township - west
Stock Township - northwest

No municipalities are located in Elk Township.

Name and history
Originally part of Monroe County, Elk Township was transferred to Noble County upon its formation on April 1, 1851.  Statewide, the only other Elk Township is located in Vinton County, although there is an Elkrun Township in Columbiana County.

Government
The township is governed by a three-member board of trustees, who are elected in November of odd-numbered years to a four-year term beginning on the following January 1. Two are elected in the year after the presidential election and one is elected in the year before it. There is also an elected township fiscal officer, who serves a four-year term beginning on April 1 of the year after the election, which is held in November of the year before the presidential election. Vacancies in the fiscal officership or on the board of trustees are filled by the remaining trustees.

References

External links
Noble County Chamber of Commerce 

Townships in Noble County, Ohio
Townships in Ohio